Sucao Township is a township in Congtai District, Handan, Hebei, China.

Administration
, the townships has six residential communities under its administration:

Hedong
Hexi
Nansucao
Wulipu
Shilipu
Liu'erzhuang

Notes and references

External links

Township-level divisions of Hebei
Handan